The men's high jump event at the 1986 World Junior Championships in Athletics was held in Athens, Greece, at Olympic Stadium on 19 and 20 July.

Medalists

Results

Final
20 July

Qualifications
19 Jul

Group A

Group B

Participation
According to an unofficial count, 36 athletes from 26 countries participated in the event.

References

High jump
High jump at the World Athletics U20 Championships